Lectionary 146, designated by sigla ℓ 146 (in the Gregory-Aland numbering) is a Greek manuscript of the New Testament, on parchment leaves. Paleographically it has been assigned to the 12th century.

Description 

The codex contains Lessons from the Gospels of John, Matthew, Luke lectionary (Evangelistarium), on 212 parchment leaves (39.8 cm by 30.1 cm), with lacunae at the end.
It is written in Greek minuscule letters, in two columns per page, 29 lines per page. It has not music notes. It contains the pericope John 8:3-11. It has Synaxarion and Menologion. It is neatly written.

History 

The manuscript was brought from Constantinople. The manuscript was examined by Hort and Gregory.

The manuscript is not cited in the critical editions of the Greek New Testament (UBS3).

Currently the codex is located in the Cambridge University Library (Dd. 8.23).

See also 

 List of New Testament lectionaries
 Biblical manuscript
 Textual criticism

Notes and references 

Greek New Testament lectionaries
12th-century biblical manuscripts
Manuscripts in Cambridge